Samuel Thornton (6 November 1754 – 3 July 1838) was one of the sons of John Thornton, a leading merchant in the Russian and Baltic trade, and was a director of the Bank of England for 53 years and Governor (1799–1801). He had earlier served as its Deputy Governor. He was Member of Parliament (MP) for Kingston upon Hull (with William Wilberforce in 1784) from 1784 to 1806 and for Surrey from 1807 to 1812. He and was a member of the Committee for the repeal of the Test and Corporation Acts.

As MP for Kingston he was painted by
Karl Anton Hickel in the group portrait "William Pitt addressing the House of Commons on the French Declaration of War, 1793" which still hangs at the National Portrait Gallery.

He bought Albury Park, Albury, Surrey in 1800, and lived there until 1811. He employed the architect Sir John Soane to improve the property.

During the early 19th century Thornton built housing in the hamlet of Weston Street, a mile to the west of Albury, for the resettlement of villagers removed from cottages in Albury Park, as part of the agricultural improvements.

His brothers Henry Thornton and Robert Thornton were also notable men of their time and MPs. all three were members of the Clapham Sect and lived in adjoining houses in Clapham.

References

External links 
 

1754 births
1838 deaths
British bankers
Members of the Parliament of Great Britain for Kingston upon Hull
Members of the Parliament of the United Kingdom for Kingston upon Hull
British MPs 1784–1790
British MPs 1790–1796
British MPs 1796–1800
Members of the Parliament of the United Kingdom for Surrey
UK MPs 1801–1802
UK MPs 1802–1806
UK MPs 1806–1807
UK MPs 1807–1812
Governors of the Bank of England
Deputy Governors of the Bank of England